Mario Edgardo Segura Aroca (born 7 October 1966) is a Honduran engineer and politician. He currently serves as deputy of the National Congress of Honduras representing the Liberal Party of Honduras for El Paraíso.

References

1966 births
Living people
Deputies of the National Congress of Honduras
Liberal Party of Honduras politicians
People from El Paraíso Department